Clay is an unincorporated community in Itawamba County, Mississippi, United States.

Clay had a post office in the early 1900s.

Notes

Unincorporated communities in Itawamba County, Mississippi
Unincorporated communities in Mississippi